Hamdan Dammag (Arabic:), (born in Ibb 28 November 1973) is a Yemeni computer scientist and a prize-winner novelist. He has several poetry and short stories publications. He is the son of the foremost Yemeni novelist Zayd Mutee' Dammaj.

He is the editor-in-chief of Ghaiman, an Arabic literature journal, the vice president of the Yemen Center for Studies and Research (YCSR) and the Vice President of the International League for Peace and Human Rights (ILPHR) - Geneva. He has several publications in computer science and literature. He received his Ph.D in computer science from the University of Reading in 2005. As part of his Ph.D., he introduced a new safety-oriented variant of Statecharts, called Safecharts.

Publications

Books 
 The Fly, a short-stories collection, Yemen Book Authority Publication, Sana'a, 2000.
 No One Was But Me!, a poetry collection, Arwiqah for Studies and Publication, Cairo, 2013.
Perhaps He Didn't Mean it!, a short-stories collection, Arrafid Publication, UAE, 2015.
 The Gemstone of Attakkar Mountain, a prize-winning novel, (1st edition: Arab Creativity Prize, Al-Sharja, UAE, 2015), (2nd edition: Arwiqah for Studies and Publication, Cairo, 2017).
The Agony of Silence: a Collection from al-Baradouni's Poems,  Alowis Foundation publication, Dubai, 2018.
Letters innocent of the polluted word: A Collection from al-Maqaleh's Poems, Al-A’edoun Publishers, Amman, 2021.

References

Yemeni emigrants to the United Kingdom
Yemeni computer scientists
British computer scientists
Yemeni novelists
21st-century British novelists
1973 births
Living people
Yemeni short story writers
21st-century Yemeni novelists
21st-century Yemeni poets